Michael Peter Evans-Freke, 12th Baron Carbery (born 11 October 1942), is a peer in the Peerage of Ireland.

He was educated at Downside School, Christ Church, Oxford (MA, 1969), the University of Strathclyde (MBA), and King's College London (PGCE).

The son of Peter Evans-Freke, 11th Baron Carbery, and Joyzelle Mary Binnie, he succeeded to the peerage upon his father's death in 2012. The heir apparent to the title is his son, Hon. Dominic Ralfe Cecil Evans-Freke (born 1969).

References

External links 
 Who's Who 2014

1942 births
Living people
People educated at Downside School
Alumni of Christ Church, Oxford
Alumni of the University of Strathclyde
Alumni of King's College London
Barons Carbery